This is a list of episodes from the third season of Barney Miller. This was the final season to feature a live studio audience.

Broadcast history
The season originally aired Thursdays at 8:30-9:00 pm (EST) and 9:00-9:30 pm (EST).

Episodes

References

Barney Miller seasons
1976 American television seasons
1977 American television seasons